Derecske is a town in Hajdú-Bihar county, in the Northern Great Plain region of eastern Hungary.

History
The town was first mentioned in 1291.

Geography

References

External links

  in Hungarian

Populated places in Hajdú-Bihar County